CEBP may refer to:
CEBPA, a human gene that modulates leptin expression
CCAAT-enhancer-binding proteins or C/EBPs
Communication Enabled Business Process